The Council of Australian Postgraduate Associations (CAPA) is the peak representative body for postgraduate students in Australia. CAPA's members are 33 postgraduate associations and the National Aboriginal & Torres Strait Islander Postgraduate Association (NATSIPA). CAPA provides member associations with representation to the Federal government, and peak bodies such as the Australian Research Council and Universities Australia, on issues affecting postgraduate students in Australia. In 2017, Australia had over 400,000 postgraduate students, representing one quarter of all tertiary students in Australia.

Recognising the dual roles of many postgraduate students, CAPA works in collaboration with the National Union of Students where matters impact on all students (such as voluntary student unionism and funding for higher education), and with the National Tertiary Education Union regarding issues of employment in the tertiary education sector, particularly on the casualisation of the academic workforce.

CAPA has an office located at the NTEU National office in Melbourne, Victoria. Its Annual Council Meeting (ACM), where organisational issues and policy directives are decided, is hosted by a different constituent organisation each year.

History 
CAPA was founded in 1979 by a coalition of ten postgraduate organisations in order to protest taxation on postgraduate research scholarships. Historically, CAPA has been concerned with lobbying around fees on postgraduate degrees.

In 1998, a separate organisation, the National Indigenous Postgraduate Association (NIPA) was formed within CAPA. This association became the National Indigenous Postgraduate Association Aboriginal Corporation (NIPAAC) in 1999, and was later restructured as the National Aboriginal and Torres Strait Islander Postgraduate Association (NATSIPA) in 2015.

Structure 
CAPA consists of elected representatives on three committees: the governing Executive Committee, the Equity committee, and the Engagement Committee. The NATSIPA Liaison Officer sits on all committees. Each committee meets on a monthly basis. New committee members are elected at the Annual Council Meeting, which is held in November.

2023 National representative committee  

National President- Nidzam Shah 

Vice President- Adam Scorgie (resigned in May 2021)

General Secretary- Muhammad Bilal Shaikh

NATSIPA Liaison Officer- Kya Branch

Media Officer- Anushka Kapoor

Policy and Research Advisor- Hameed (resigned in May 2021)

International Officer- Vineet Prabhakar

Women's Officer- Catherine Allingham

Queer Officer- 

Disabilities Officer- Carmelina Monea  (resigned in March 2021)

2023 Board of directors 

Chair of the Board- Sharlene Leroy-Dyer

Secretary of the board- Nidzam Hussain (superseded by Brinda Asarpota)

Member of the board- Maimuna Majimbi (resigned June 2021)

Member of the board- Jeremy Waite (resigned November 2021)

Member of the board- Simran Kaur

Member of the board- Brinda Asarpota

Member of the board- Jessica Lu (resigned November 2021)

NATSIPA Board Representative- Kylie Day

Past office bearers

National presidents

Vice presidents

General Secretary

International Officer

Treasurer

Executive and Research Officer - Policy and Research Officer

Media & Communications Officer

See also
Education in Australia
Student unionism in Australia

References

External links
CAPA website
National Aboriginal and Torres Strait Islander Postgraduates Association

Education in Australia
Students' unions in Australia
National postgraduate representative bodies
Student politics in Australia
Groups of students' unions